Charles Golding Constable (1821–1878) was a member of the British East India Company's navy, joining up in his youth. He was the second son of the painter John Constable and, on his elder brother John Charles's death in 1841, became head of the Constable family.

He oversaw the splitting-up of his father's studio collection in winter 1847/48. On his death in 1878 he was buried alongside John Charles and their parents in the family tomb at St John-at-Hampstead, Hampstead.

He was the only one of John Constable's children to have issue.

References

External links
Sketch by John owned by Charles Golding 
The Constable family, including the painter's children are discussed in The Irish Bomfords 1617 to the Present,  Chapter XXXIII: John Francis’ Children  1870 – 1980s" Retrieved 26 November 2012.
Charles Golding Constable in "A genealogical and heraldic history of the landed gentry of Ireland" 
Constable's England, a full text exhibition catalog from The Metropolitan Museum of Art

1821 births
1878 deaths
British East India Company Marine personnel
John Constable